Tenuidactylus dadunensis is a species of gecko that is endemic to China.

References 

Tenuidactylus
Reptiles described in 2011